The 1973 Berlin Open was a men's tennis tournament staged in Berlin, West Germany. The men's event was part of the Grand Prix circuit and categorized in Group C. The tournament was played on outdoor clay courts and was held from 4 June until 11 June 1973. It was the inaugural edition of the tournament and Hans-Jürgen Pohmann won the singles title.

Finals

Singles
 Hans-Jürgen Pohmann defeated  Karl Meiler 6–3, 3–6, 6–3, 6–3
 It was Pohmann's first singles title of his career.

Doubles
 Jürgen Fassbender /  Hans-Jürgen Pohmann defeated  Raúl Ramírez /  Joaquin Loyo-Mayo 4–6, 6–4, 6–4

References

External links
 ITF tournament edition details

Berlin Open
Berlin Open
Berlin Open, 1973
Berlin Open